The Alpha Persei Cluster, also known as Melotte 20 or Collinder 39, is an open cluster of stars in the northern constellation of Perseus. To the naked eye, the cluster consists of several blue-hued spectral type B stars. The most luminous member is the ~2nd magnitude white-yellow supergiant Mirfak, also known as Alpha Persei. Bright members also include Delta, Sigma, Psi, 29, 30, 34, and 48 Persei. The Hipparcos satellite and infrared color-magnitude diagram fitting have been used to establish a distance to the cluster of ~. The distance established via the independent analyses agree, thereby making the cluster an important rung on the cosmic distance ladder. As seen from the Earth, the extinction of the cluster due to interstellar dust is around 0.30.

The cluster is centered to the northeast of Alpha Persei. The cluster shows solid evidence of having undergone mass segregation, with the mean stellar mass decreasing toward the edge. The age of this cluster is about 50–70 million years. Cluster member stars show a near-solar metallicity, meaning the abundance of elements with atomic numbers higher than 2 are similar to those in the Sun. The cluster shows evidence of tidal tails, which are most likely of galactic origin.

The cluster field displays evidence of a much larger, background star stream.

Members
The following prominent stars are considered members of the cluster with high likelihood:

See also
Coma Star Cluster

References

External links
 
 

 
Open clusters
Perseus (constellation)